3DG may refer to:

 3-Deoxyglucosone
 Three Days Grace